Lukhambi is a village in Tamenglong district of Manipur, India.

See also 
 Tamenglong district

References 

Villages in Tamenglong district